The European Statutory Instruments Committee is a select committee of the House of Commons in the Parliament of the United Kingdom. It has a remit to consider proposed instruments relating to the European Union.

Membership 
As of 15 March 2020, the members of the committee are as follows:

See also 

 List of Committees of the United Kingdom Parliament

References 

Select Committees of the British House of Commons